The Battlefords—Meadow Lake was a federal electoral district in Saskatchewan, Canada, that was represented in the House of Commons of Canada from 1979 to 1997.

This riding was created in 1976 from parts of Battleford—Kindersley, Meadow Lake and Saskatoon—Biggar ridings.

It was abolished in 1996 when it was redistributed into Churchill River, Battlefords—Lloydminster, Wanuskewin and Saskatoon—Rosetown  ridings.

Election results

See also 

 List of Canadian federal electoral districts
 Past Canadian electoral districts

External links 

Former federal electoral districts of Saskatchewan